{{safesubst:#invoke:RfD||2=Rogue Squadron (upcoming film)|month = March
|day = 16
|year = 2023
|time = 07:58
|timestamp = 20230316075844

|content=
REDIRECT List of Star Wars films#Rogue Squadron (TBA)

}}